El herrero ("The Blacksmith") is a 1944 Mexican film. It stars Carlos Orellana.

External links
 

1944 films
1940s Spanish-language films
Mexican black-and-white films
Mexican drama films
1944 drama films
1940s Mexican films